Qorqoruk-e Sofla (also Romanized as Qorqorūk-e Soflá, Qareqorūk, Qarqorūk-e Soflá, and Qarqorūk Soflá; also known as Qorqorūk-e Pā’īn) is a village in Abravan Rural District, Razaviyeh District, Mashhad County, Razavi Khorasan Province, Iran. At the 2006 census, its population was 312, in 76 families.

References 

Populated places in Mashhad County